KBLM may refer to:

 Monmouth Executive Airport (ICAO code KBLM)
 KBLM-LP, a defunct low-power television station (channel 25) formerly licensed to Riverside and Perris, California, United States